Frank Leslie Smith (November 24, 1867 – August 30, 1950) was an Illinois politician.

Biography
Smith was born in Dwight, Illinois, in Livingston County He served as a United States Congressman from 1919 to 1921.

Career
Smith first ran for the Republican primary nomination for the U.S. Senate in 1920.  In that first year of suffrage, women's votes were counted separately from men's in Illinois.  He was beating William B. McKinley by 27,000 votes after the male votes were counted, but once the female votes were counted, McKinley had won by 11,000 votes.  McKinley went on to win the general election as well.

In 1921, Smith became the chairman of the Illinois Commerce Commission, which oversaw utilities in the state. He prepared to run again for the Senate in 1926. At the time, Illinois had no campaign finance laws and Smith collected the unprecedented amount of $400,000 from several wealthy executives who ran public utilities, including $125,000 from Samuel Insull.

In 1926 he defeated McKinley in the Republican primary for the Senate.  Smith went on to win the general election held in November of that year, although Julius Rosenwald of Sears, Roebuck & Company had offered him $550,000 stock to withdraw.

McKinley, whose lame duck term would normally have extended until March 1927, died in December 1926, so Illinois Governor Len Small (R) appointed Smith to fulfill the rest of McKinley's term, a fairly common practice when the incumbent senator has died or otherwise ceased to serve. But when Smith presented his credentials as the newly appointed Senator, the U.S. Senate voted to not allow him to qualify as a senator, based upon alleged fraud and corruption in his campaign for the full term.  In a new special election he tried again to qualify as the elected Senator in March 1927, but was again denied.  He finally resigned his seat on February 9, 1928.

See also
Frank L. Smith Bank
 Frank L. Smith | Society for American Baseball Research Biography
Unseated members of the United States Congress

References

 "Frank L. Smith, 82, Lost Senate Seat," New York Times, August 31, 1950, p 22.
 Carroll Hill Wooddy, The Case of Frank L. Smith: A Study in Representative Government, University of Chicago, Chicago, IL, 1931.

External links

|-

|-

1867 births
1950 deaths
Members of the United States Senate declared not entitled to their seat
People from Dwight, Illinois
Politicians from Chicago
Republican Party members of the United States House of Representatives from Illinois
Republican Party United States senators from Illinois